The seventeenth edition of LOS40 Music Awards took place at the WiZink Center in Madrid, on November 4, 2022. Rosalía is the most nominated act with seven nominations, followed by Harry Styles.

Performances
The following is a list of artists slated to perform at the award show:

Winners and nominees
Nominees were revealed on September 27, 2022, at an announcement dinner held in Palma de Mallorca.

References

2022 music awards